Abibion (fl. 5th century) was one of the founders of Bet-Coryph monastery in Byzantine Syria, together with Eusebonas. He also served as first abbot of that monastery. He is included in the Heiligen-Lexicon.  He received his instruction from Eusebius. His feast day, if he had one, is unknown.

References

Sources
 Holweck, F. G., A Biographical Dictionary of the Saints. St. Louis, MO: B. Herder Book Co. 1924.
 Davies, Gordon J, Social Life of Early Christians, Lutterworth Press (1954)

5th-century deaths
Byzantine abbots
Byzantine saints
5th-century Christian saints
Year of birth unknown